Ravi Sehgal (born 2 May 1971) is an Indian former cricketer. He played eight first-class matches for Delhi between 1993 and 1996.

See also
 List of Delhi cricketers

References

External links
 

1971 births
Living people
Indian cricketers
Delhi cricketers
Cricketers from Delhi